Derek John Walker (born 3 July 1966) is a Scottish retired football midfielder who made over 280 appearances in the Scottish League, most notably for Queen's Park and East Stirlingshire.

References

Scottish footballers
Scottish Football League players
Queen's Park F.C. players
Association football forwards
1966 births
Footballers from Glasgow
Clyde F.C. players
Hamilton Academical F.C. players
Livingston F.C. players
Kilmarnock F.C. players
Stirling Albion F.C. players
East Stirlingshire F.C. players
Stranraer F.C. players
Albion Rovers F.C. players
Living people